Freehand may refer to:

 Freehand drawing, a drawing made without the help of devices
 Freehand lace, a bobbin lace worked directly onto fabric
 , drumming technique
 Adobe FreeHand, software package
 Free Hand, a 1975 album by Gentle Giant

Companies
 Freehand Books, literary imprint
 Freehand Productions, media company

See also
 Free Hands
 Handsfree